Nastra neamathla, known generally as the neamathla skipper or southern swarthy skipper, is a species of grass skipper in the butterfly family Hesperiidae. It is found in Central America and North America.

The MONA or Hodges number for Nastra neamathla is 3995.

References

Further reading

 

Hesperiinae
Articles created by Qbugbot